Alachnothorax bruchi is a species of beetle in the family Carabidae, the only species in the genus Alachnothorax.

References

Ctenodactylinae